Deutsche Elektronische Musik is a compilation album of German electronic and rock music released in 2010 by Soul Jazz Records.

Release
Deutsche Elektronische Musik was released by Soul Jazz Records on April 5, 2010. A follow-up titled Deutsche Elektronische Musik 2 was released by Soul Jazz in 2013. The album was re-released by Soul Jazz in 2018.

Reception

From contemporary reviews, Dave Simpson of The Guardian gave the album a five-star rating out of five, declaring that it is "a near-definitive guide to some of the world's most extraordinary music". For AllMusic Richie Unterberger described it as including "works by some of the most renowned exponents of [krautrock]" with the exception of Kraftwerk and that the album "yields a good cross-section of a style that was likely more influential in subsequent decades than it was at the time". 
John Garratt of PopMatters reviewed the album in 2018, commenting on Simpson's comment of the album being "definitive", while stating that they do their "best to distance myself from such superlatives, but I'm not going to go through any writing gymnastics to say that the writer is wrong. This is extraordinary music. To say that it's near-definitive is a matter of hair-splitting. Any way you look at it, it's worth the time, money, and posterity."

Track listing
Track listing adapted from the album's liner notes and sleeve.

Disc 1

Disc 2

References

Sources
 
 
 
 

2010 compilation albums
Soul Jazz Records compilation albums
Krautrock albums